Avim is an old and uncommon Russian Christian male first name. The name is possibly derived from the Greek word aēma, meaning a light breeze.

The diminutives of "Avim" are Avimka, Ava, and Ima.

The patronymics derived from "Avim" are "" (Avimovich; masculine) and "" (Avimovna; feminine).

References

Notes

Sources
А. В. Суперанская (A. V. Superanskaya). "Современный словарь личных имён: Сравнение. Происхождение. Написание" (Modern Dictionary of First Names: Comparison. Origins. Spelling). Айрис-пресс. Москва, 2005. 
Н. А. Петровский (N. A. Petrovsky). "Словарь русских личных имён" (Dictionary of Russian First Names). ООО Издательство "АСТ". Москва, 2005. 

